The  (lit. Chita Peninsula Road) is a 4-laned toll road in Aichi Prefecture, Japan. It is managed by Aichi Prefectural Road Public Corporation.

Overview

A portion of the road was opened to traffic in 1970 and the entire road was completed in 1971. The road was originally built by Japan Highway Public Corporation and management was transferred to Aichi Prefectural Road Public Corporation in 1983.

Officially the road is designated as Aichi Prefectural Route 55. The road is designated  (motor vehicles must have a displacement of at least 125 cc), and the design standard of the road is similar to national expressways.

The road is an important route connecting Chubu International Airport with central Nagoya. In 2005 a junction was built to connect the Chitahantō Road to the newly constructed airport through the Chitaōdan Road.

Interchange list

 IC - interchange, JCT - junction, PA - parking area

See also

References

External links
 Aichi Prefectural Road Public Corporation

Toll roads in Japan
Roads in Aichi Prefecture
1970 establishments in Japan